Orrville is an unincorporated community in Knox County, Indiana, in the United States.

History
A post office was established at Orrville in 1895, and it remained in operation until it was discontinued in 1904. Two members of the Orr family served as postmasters.

References

Unincorporated communities in Knox County, Indiana
Unincorporated communities in Indiana